Victoria Chika Ezerim is a Nigerian taekwondo practitioner who competes in the women's senior category. She won a bronze medal at the 2003 African Taekwondo Championships in the –63 kg category.

Sports career 
Victoria participated at the 2003 African Taekwondo Championships held in Abuja, Nigeria and in the 73 kg event, she won a bronze medal.

References 

Living people
Year of birth missing (living people)
Nigerian female taekwondo practitioners
Place of birth missing (living people)
21st-century Nigerian women